Kazantyp ( or Каза́н-Тип, Kazan-Typ;  or Каза́н-Тип Kazan-Tip) is a headland (or a cape) located in the northeastern part of the Crimean peninsula on the shore of the Azov Sea. 
The Crimean Tatar name qazan tüp (dialectal qazan tip)  means "cauldron's bottom" referring to its concave profile.

Overview
It extends far into the sea from the coastline with its length being about 3–4 km. Its highest point is 107 metres above  sea level, with the average being 30–40 metres while its lowest inland point is 20–30 metres above  sea level.

The Kazantyp headland is mostly covered with steppe. In 1998 it was designated as Kazantypskyi State Nature Reserve of Ukraine. On the eastern half of the cape are located ancient ruins of a settlement dating back to the 3rd and 2nd centuries BC.

The Kazantyp Lighthouse is located on the headland. From 1995 to 1999, the international electronic music festival, KaZantip, named for the headland, was held nearby.

References

External links

 The Cape Kazantip

Landforms of the Sea of Azov
Headlands of Crimea
Headlands of Ukraine
Ramsar sites in Ukraine